Berry Center  may refer to:

Berry Center of Northwest Houston, Cypress, Texas, United States
Berry Events Center, Marquette, Michigan, United States